Herschel is a large crater in the leading hemisphere of the Saturnian moon Mimas, centered on the equator at 112° longitude. It is named after the 18th-century astronomer William Herschel, who discovered Mimas in 1789.

Size
Herschel is the second-largest crater relative to its parent body of any equilibrium planetary moon in the Solar System after Tethys's crater Odysseus. It is so large that astronomers have expressed surprise that Mimas was not shattered by the impact that caused it.

Origin
The impact that formed Herschel must have nearly disrupted Mimas entirely. Chasmata that may be stress fractures due to shock waves from the impact traveling through it and focusing there can be seen on the opposite side of Mimas. The impact is also suspected of having something to do with the current "Pac-Man"–shaped temperature pattern on Mimas. Herschel has an estimated age of around 4.1 billion years.

Media reception

The similarity between Mimas's appearance and the Death Star in Star Wars due to the large size of Herschel has often been noted, both in the press and in NASA/JPL press releases. This is a coincidence, however, as the crater's similarities were not discovered until 1980 after Voyager 1 gained line of sight, three years after the film was made.

See also
List of largest craters in the Solar System
List of tallest mountains in the Solar System

References

External links

 - featuring the Voyager 1 image

 - different photo than the 1995 one with the same title, features the Cassini image

Impact craters on Saturn's moons
Mimas (moon)